This is the list of all Stade Rennais F.C.'s European matches.

Overall record
Accurate as of 23 February 2023

Legend: GF = Goals For. GA = Goals Against. GD = Goal Difference.

Results

References

Stade Rennais F.C.
French football clubs in international competitions